Firuzabad (also Romanized as Fīrūzābād and Firooz Abad; also known as Boneh-ye Gholāmreẕa) is a village in Mahur Berenji Rural District, Sardasht District, Dezful County, Khuzestan Province, Iran. At the 2006 census, its population was 371, in 85 families.

References 

Populated places in Dezful County